The Schlee-Kemmler Building is a historic building in Downtown Columbus, Ohio. The building was listed on the National Register of Historic Places in 1982 and the Columbus Register of Historic Properties in 1983. It was also included in the South High Commercial Historic District, added to those registers in 1983 and 1987, respectively.

The building was nominated to the National Register for its significance as one of few 19th century commercial buildings with stone facades left in Columbus, and the most ornamental of those that remain.

See also
 National Register of Historic Places listings in Columbus, Ohio

References

Commercial buildings on the National Register of Historic Places in Ohio
Romanesque Revival architecture in Ohio
Commercial buildings completed in 1885
National Register of Historic Places in Columbus, Ohio
Columbus Register properties
Buildings in downtown Columbus, Ohio
High Street (Columbus, Ohio)
Individually listed contributing properties to historic districts on the National Register in Ohio
Historic district contributing properties in Columbus, Ohio